Avadan is a rural locality (a selo) in Dokuzparinsky District, Dagestan, Russia. The population was 2894 as of 2018. There are 44 streets.

Geography 
The village is located on the Rubas River, 89 km northeast of Usukhchay (the district's administrative centre) by road. Arablyar is the nearest rural locality.

References 

Rural localities in Dokuzparinsky District